Jasmine Paolini was the defending champion but chose not to participate.

Ángela Fita Boluda won the title, defeating Despina Papamichail in the final, 6–2, 6–0.

Seeds

Draw

Finals

Top half

Bottom half

References

Main Draw

Internazionali Femminili di Brescia - Singles